Son of Mongolia (Russian: Syn Mongolii) is a 1936 Soviet drama film directed by Ilya Trauberg and starring Tse-Ven Rabdan, Igin-Khorlo nd Susor-Barma.

The film's sets were designed by the art director Igor Vuskovich.

Cast
 Tse-Ven Rabdan 
 Igin-Khorlo as Dulma 
 Susor-Barma as Chauffeur
 Bato-Ochir  as The Prince 
 Gam-Bo as Innkeeper 
 Ir-Kan  as Prince's Foreign Advisor 
 Zigmit as The Monk

References

Bibliography 
 Amy Sargeant. Storm Over Asia: Kinofile Filmmakers' Companion 11. I. B. Tauris, 2007.

External links 
 

1936 films
Soviet drama films
1936 drama films
1930s Russian-language films
Soviet black-and-white films